

This is a list of the National Register of Historic Places listings in Clay County, South Dakota.

This is intended to be a complete list of the properties and districts on the National Register of Historic Places in Clay County, South Dakota, United States. The locations of National Register properties and districts for which the latitude and longitude coordinates are included below, may be seen in a map.

There are 42 properties and districts listed on the National Register in the county.  Another 2 properties were once listed but have since been removed.

Current listings

|}

Former listings

|}

See also

 List of National Historic Landmarks in South Dakota
 National Register of Historic Places listings in South Dakota

References

 
Clay County